Bubure may be:

Vute language 
Bure language